The Number Ones is a compilation album of hits by The Beatles released in 1983 by EMI on the Parlophone Records label in Australia.  It is a localised version of the 1982 compilation album 20 Greatest Hits.

Background
To reflect Australia's differing tastes, EMI Australia issued its own version of 20 Greatest Hits.  As The Beatles had 23 number ones in Australia, the title was aptly changed to The Number Ones.  However, not all tracks would fit into a standard vinyl LP, so three tracks ("Love Me Do", "I Feel Fine" and "Rock and Roll Music") were added as a bonus EP that came with the original album.

The Australian album is unique as it is the only album release of the original 1963 stereo mix of "I Want To Hold Your Hand".  This was only previously available on a 1976 Australian reissue of the original single. This stereo mix of the song has never been officially released on compact disc or any other digital format.

Release
The album was released May 1983 on both LP and cassette.  It spent one week at the top of the Australian album charts in 1983.

Due to timing problems, EMI included a three-track bonus EP (A-980) with the 20-track LP. Without the same length limitations, the cassette version contains all 23 tracks.

The Number Ones stayed in print in Australia until 1991.  It was deleted (with other Australian only compilations) when EMI Australia ceased vinyl production.  It was never released on compact disc.

Track listing

LP Version

Cassette version

Chart positions

See also
20 Greatest Hits

References

1983 greatest hits albums
Albums produced by George Martin
Albums recorded at Apple Studios
Albums recorded at Trident Studios
The Beatles compilation albums
Compilation albums of number-one songs
EMI Records compilation albums